Bryansky (masculine), Bryanskaya (feminine), or Bryanskoye (neuter) may refer to:
Bryansky District, a district of Bryansk Oblast, Russia
Bryansky (rural locality) (Bryanskaya, Bryanskoye), name of several rural localities in Russia
Bryansk Oblast (Bryanskaya oblast), a federal subject of Russia